Elsa Maria Giöbel-Oyler (1882-1979) was a Swedish painter.

Biography
Giöbel-Oyler was born in the small hamlet of Hällefors, Sweden to father, Adrian Giöbel and mother, Maria Matilda Carolina Giöbel. She had three sisters, Anna Maria Björk, Louise Maria Hayward and Gerda Maria Lummis; and two brothers, Karl Fredrik Giöbel and Christian Gunnar Giöbel. Her aunt, Selma Giöbel, was a well-known textile artist. In 1911, she married the writer, Philip Oyler, and in 1913 they had a daughter, Soldanella Oyler, who became an illustrator.

Work
She is known for her still life, figurative and landscape paintings. In 1928 and 1929, her work was shown at the Southampton Art Society, England. Also in 1929 she had an exhibition at the Royal Academy in London. In 1937 her work was exhibited at the Renaissance Art Galleries, London. In 1952 she was given a retrospective exhibition at the Örebro Museum.

Collections
Giöbel-Oyler is represented in the permanent collection of the Nationalmuseum Stockholm.

Death
Giöbel-Oyler died in 1972 in the small town of Nora, in the county of Örebro, in Sweden.

References

1882 births
1979 deaths
Swedish women artists